The Corsican File is a 2004 French comedy film directed by Alain Berbérian. It is based on the comic book of the same name, one of the stories from the Jack Palmer series by René Pétillon.

The film was produced by Gaumont and Legend, and written by Christian Clavier and Michel Delgado. The story follows the escapades of private investigator Jack Palmer, a pseudonym of Rémi Francois, trying to locate a man living on the island of Corsica who is to inherit a property from a will.

Reception 
Nicolas Jouenne of Le Figaro said, "And you must admit that the two actors stick to their characters perfectly! Although he has not adopted the unmistakable look of Jack Palmer, Christian Clavier is shown in a relatively convincing interpretation while retaining far from his usual bidding a bit boring. Facing him, Jean Reno turns out perfect in solitary independence leader and blood, in addition to the Corsican accent!"

Cast 
 Christian Clavier as Rémi François / Jack Palmer
 Jean Reno as Ange Leoni
 Caterina Murino as Léa
 Didier Flamand as Dargent
 Pierre Salasca as Matéo
 Eric Fraticelli (credited as Pido) as Figoli
 Alain Maratrat as De Vlaminck
 François Orsoni as Balducci
 Nathanaël Maïni as Grappa
 Albert Dray as Le capitaine de gendarmerie
 Daniel Delorme as Doumé
 Guy Cimino as Borgnoli
 Jo Fondacci as Diazep
 Philippe Guerrini as Le Marseillais
 Tzek as Bruno

References

External links
 
 

2004 films
2004 comedy films
Films directed by Alain Berbérian
Films based on French comics
Live-action films based on comics
Films set in Corsica
Films shot in Corsica
French comedy films
French detective films
2000s French films